Nikolay Chuchalov (13 August 1932 – 5 May 2011) was a Soviet wrestler. He competed in the men's Greco-Roman middleweight at the 1960 Summer Olympics.

References

External links
 

1932 births
2011 deaths
People from Kirov Oblast
Soviet male sport wrestlers
Olympic wrestlers of the Soviet Union
Wrestlers at the 1960 Summer Olympics